The 131st Regiment Illinois Volunteer Infantry was an infantry regiment that served in the Union Army during the American Civil War.

Service
The 131st Illinois Infantry was organized at Old Fort Massac, Illinois, and mustered into Federal service on November 13, 1862, for a three-year enlistment.

The regiment was consolidated with the 29th Illinois Volunteer Infantry Regiment on November 15, 1863.

Total strength and casualties
1 enlisted man killed, 11 officers and 282 enlisted men who died of disease, for a total of 294 fatalities.

Commanders
Colonel George W. Neely.

See also
List of Illinois Civil War Units
Illinois in the American Civil War

Notes

References
The Civil War Archive

Further reading
 Illinois. Report of the Adjutant General of the State of Illinois. Springfield, Ill: Phillips Bros, 1900. 
 Lester, Robert, and Gary Hoag. Civil War Unit Histories [Part 4], The Union, Midwest and West. Bethesda, Md: University Publications of America, 1994. 

Units and formations of the Union Army from Illinois
1862 establishments in Illinois
Military units and formations established in 1862
Military units and formations disestablished in 1865